The Heinonen HK-1 Keltiäinen is a Finnish single-seat, single-engined sport aircraft of the 1950s. Only a single example was built, which was used by its designer to set a class distance record in 1957 that stood for 18 years before being beaten.

Design and development
Juhani Heinonen, an aeronautical engineer who had previously worked for the Valmet aircraft factory at Tampere, and then for Finnair, designed a single-seat, single engined aerobatic sport aircraft, the Heinonen HK-1. It was a low winged monoplane of all-wooden construction, powered by a Walter Mikron air-cooled inline engine rated at  driving a two-bladed propeller. Split flaps were fitted to the wings, while the aircraft had a fixed tailwheel undercarriage, with a steerable tailwheel but no brakes. The pilot sat under a sliding perspex canopy. A prototype was built at the glider school at Jämi, first flying in August 1954.

Operational history
The HK-1 was displayed at the 1955 and 1957 Ypenburg airshows. For this flight, Heinonen was awarded a Louis Blériot medal by the Fédération Aéronautique Internationale. This record was not broken until 2 July 1975.

The aircraft is now preserved at the Finnish Aviation Museum near Helsinki Airport.

Specifications

See also

Notes

References

1950s Finnish sport aircraft
Low-wing aircraft
Single-engined tractor aircraft
Aircraft first flown in 1954
Conventional landing gear